Woodbank may refer to:

United Kingdom
Woodbank, Cheshire, a village
Woodbank, Stockport, a villa and garden in Greater Manchester, 

United States
Woodbank (Culver, Indiana), listed on the National Register of Historic Places